The following is a list of European countries by steel production. Figures are from the World Steel Association.

See also
 Steel industry
 List of countries by steel production
 Global steel industry trends
 List of steel producers
 List of countries by iron ore production

References

External links 
 World Steel Association

Steel industry by country
Lists of countries by production